The Clark–Lester House is a historic home located at Lancaster in Erie County, New York.  It is a Queen Anne style dwelling constructed about 1891. It was home to noted psychology professor Olive Lester, who lived here for most of her adult life until May 1996.  She was the first woman chair of any of the departments at the University at Buffalo. It is now operated as a bed and breakfast.

It was listed on the National Register of Historic Places in 1999.  It is located in the Broadway Historic District.

References

External links
Clark–Lester House – U.S. National Register of Historic Places on Waymarking.com

Houses on the National Register of Historic Places in New York (state)
Queen Anne architecture in New York (state)
Houses completed in 1891
Houses in Erie County, New York
National Register of Historic Places in Erie County, New York
Historic district contributing properties in Erie County, New York